Thomas A. "Pistol Pete" Albright (December 23, 1909 – June 29, 1986) was an American baseball pitcher in the Negro leagues. He played with the Bacharach Giants in 1929 and the New York Cubans in 1936.

References

External links
 and  Seamheads

Bacharach Giants players
New York Cubans players
1909 births
1986 deaths
Baseball players from Texas
Baseball pitchers
People from Crockett, Texas
20th-century African-American sportspeople